is a Japanese politician of the Liberal Democratic Party, a member of the House of Representatives in the Diet (national legislature). He has also held a professorship at Shoin University. A native of Nagano Prefecture and graduate of Meiji Gakuin University, he was elected to his first term in 2012. As of 2021, he was the Chairman of the Judicial Affairs Committee.

References

External links 
  in Japanese.

Members of the House of Councillors (Japan)
Japanese educators
1971 births
Living people
Liberal Democratic Party (Japan) politicians
Meiji Gakuin University alumni
21st-century Japanese politicians